The Grave Creek Bridge is a covered bridge in Josephine County in the U.S. state of Oregon.

Built in 1920, it originally carried U.S. Route 99, the Pacific Highway. The only remaining covered bridge in Josephine County, it is "Oregon's most viewed covered bridge" because of its location near I-5.

The structure was added to the National Register of Historic Places in 1979. It was closed for repairs in the late 1990s and reopened in 2001.

The  Howe truss bridge features six Gothic windows on each side as well as rounded portals and a shake roof. The original architects were A. A. Clausen and J. Elmer Nelson.

See also
List of bridges documented by the Historic American Engineering Record in Oregon
List of bridges on the National Register of Historic Places in Oregon
List of Oregon covered bridges

References

External links

Bridges completed in 1920
Covered bridges on the National Register of Historic Places in Oregon
Wooden bridges in Oregon
Tourist attractions in Josephine County, Oregon
Historic American Engineering Record in Oregon
National Register of Historic Places in Josephine County, Oregon
Road bridges on the National Register of Historic Places in Oregon
Howe truss bridges in the United States
Transportation buildings and structures in Josephine County, Oregon